Buy Me That Town is a 1941 American comedy film directed by Eugene Forde and written by Murray Boltinoff, Harry A. Gourfair, Gordon Kahn and Martin Rackin. The film stars Lloyd Nolan, Constance Moore, Albert Dekker, Sheldon Leonard, Barbara Jo Allen, Edward Brophy and Warren Hymer. The film was released on October 3, 1941, by Paramount Pictures.

Plot

After racketeer Chink Moran is drafted by the Army, his second-in-command Rickey Dean decides that the gang is no longer relevant and shuts things down. He and his pal Louie Lanzer leave NY to travel the country and decide what to do next. Their speeding car is stopped outside a tiny Connecticut village, and they're brought up before Judge Paradise and his beautiful clerk Virginia, who naturally arouses Rickey's interest. They're fined what they deem to be an inordinate amount, and not having the cash on them, accept jail time until their attorney can wire the money to bail them out.

The judge explains to Rickey that the town has been bankrupt since the local factory shut down. But because it's unincorporated, it's free to raise revenue through huge fines. This gives Rickey a brainstorm and he actually purchases the town, intending to turn it into a haven where fugitives can hide out safely in jail by simply refusing to pay the fines. He recruits some of his old gang members for civic positions like police and fire chiefs (the latter position filled by, of course, an arsonist). Louie meanwhile finds himself a potential girl friend in the person of their landlady Henriette, who turns out to be a gangster groupie and wants to be his "mole" (mispronouncing "moll").

Virginia appeals to Rickey to do something worthwhile, like reopen the factory and upgrade the town's facilities. Swayed by her charms, he begins investing in the town and helping to modernize it. But then Chink is released from the Army; he arrives in town and decides to deal himself in, but his ideas for illegal activities clash with the now-converted Rickey's plans. Things escalate toward an inevitable showdown, with Louie the linchpin in their battle for the town's future.

Cast 
Lloyd Nolan as Rickey Deane
Constance Moore as Virginia Paradise
Albert Dekker as Louie Lanzer
Sheldon Leonard as Chink Moran
Barbara Jo Allen as Henriette Teagarden
Edward Brophy as Ziggy
Warren Hymer as Crusher Howard
Horace McMahon as Fingers Flint
Richard Carle as Judge Paradise
Olin Howland as Constable Sam Smedley 
Rod Cameron as Gerard
Russell Hicks as Malcolm
Charles Lane as J. Montague Gainsborough
Edwin Maxwell as P.V. Baxter
Pierre Watkin as Carlton Williams
Jack Chapin as Tom
Keith Richards as Harry
Trevor Bardette as George
John Harmon as Heckler
Si Jenks as Heckler
Guy Usher as Norton
Broderick O'Farrell as Moffett
Jack W. Johnston as Buckley
Lillian Yarbo as Nancy
Ella Neal as Mother
Harry C. Bradley as Reverend Brooks
George Chandler as Smedley Son-In-Law
Phil Tead as Mr. Ramsey, Druggist
Blanche Rose as Mrs. O'Hara
Joe Bautista as Butler

References

External links 
 

1941 films
1940s English-language films
Paramount Pictures films
American comedy films
1941 comedy films
Films directed by Eugene Forde
American black-and-white films
1940s American films